Newman Post Card Co. (1904–1918) was founded by Oscar Newman. The Newman Post Card Company published post cards in hand colored collotype and tinted halftones, which were mostly holiday cards and views of Southern California.

History

Oscar Newman (1872-1928) was born in Vienna, Austria on December 5, 1872. He came to New York in 1901, on the ship Majestic. On March 29, 1903, Newman married Lucie Bloch (1882-1943), in New York. The couple moved to Los Angeles, California, where Newman became a manufacturer of novelties and post cards.

Newman started the Newman Post Card Co., in 1904, at a firm located in Los Angeles. The company published post cards in hand colored collotype and tinted halftones, which were mostly holiday cards and views of Southern California. They also published a set on the 1906 San Francisco earthquake and the Panama–Pacific International Exposition. Many of their cards were printed with the Newman Post Card Co. logo. 

Newman also published under the name of Oscar Newman Company. There were 132 postcards distributed by the 
Oscar Newman Company of Los Angeles and San Francisco. The illustrations of eighteen missions and two Capillas were printed in Germany prior to World War I and later in the United States.

After the 1906 San Francisco earthquake, Newman sold a set of Earthquake Post Cards. He did a series of Santa Catalina Island, California post cards from 1907-1911. His wife was his assistant in their business. By 1920, they had moved back to New York.

In 1908, photographer and publisher Charles Weidner sold his scenic post card business to the Newman Post Card Company of Los Angeles. Newman later moved to a San Francisco sales office on 2nd Street. Newman worked with Edward H. Mitchell for the February 1911, formation of Exposition Publishing Co., which was an organization that captured the souvenir post card business for the 1915 Panama–Pacific International Exposition.

Gallery 
The following images are samples of postcards printed by Newman Post Cards Co.

References

External links
 Newman Post Card Co.

German printers
Postcard publishers
Publishing companies established in 1904